Glutathione S-transferase Mu 4 is an enzyme that in humans is encoded by the GSTM4 gene.

Cytosolic and membrane-bound forms of glutathione S-transferase are encoded by two distinct supergene families. At present, eight distinct classes of the soluble cytoplasmic mammalian glutathione S-transferases have been identified: alpha, kappa, mu, omega, pi, sigma, theta and zeta. This gene encodes a glutathione S-transferase that belongs to the mu class. The mu class of enzymes functions in the detoxification of electrophilic compounds, including carcinogens, therapeutic drugs, environmental toxins and products of oxidative stress, by conjugation with glutathione. The genes encoding the mu class of enzymes are organized in a gene cluster on chromosome 1p13.3 and are known to be highly polymorphic. These genetic variations can change an individual's susceptibility to carcinogens and toxins as well as affect the toxicity and efficacy of certain drugs. Diversification of these genes has occurred in regions encoding substrate-binding domains, as well as in tissue expression patterns, to accommodate an increasing number of foreign compounds. Multiple transcript variants, each encoding a distinct protein isoform, have been identified.

In the August 2009 issue of Oncogene journal, researchers at Huntsman Cancer Institute (HCI) at the University of Utah demonstrated that expression levels of GSTM4 could predict response to chemotherapy in patients with Ewing sarcoma.  The study found that patients who did not respond to chemotherapy had high levels of GSTM4.

References

Further reading

External links